Roald was, around the year 1450, Lawman (or Lawspeaker) of the Faroe Islands.

Little is known about Roald, apart from that he had a farm in Dalur, and that he probably originated from Shetland.

In G.V.C. Young's textbook, Færøerne – fra vikingetiden til reformationen, Roald is not named. However, in the Lagting's official list of First Ministers, he is included.<ref>Løgtingið 150 – Hátíðarrit. Tórshavn 2002, Bind 2, S. 366. (Section First Ministers of the Faroes up to 1816) (PDF-Download</ref>

References

G. V. C. Young: Færøerne – fra vikingetiden til reformationen''. København 1982. s. 88

Faroese people of Scottish descent
Lawmen of the Faroe Islands
15th-century Norwegian people
Year of birth unknown
Year of death unknown